Poindexter Dunn (November 3, 1834 – October 12, 1914) was an American politician and a U.S. Representative from Arkansas.

Biography
Born in Wake County, North Carolina near Raleigh, Dunn was the son of Grey and Lydia Baucum Dunn. He moved with his father to Limestone County, Alabama, in 1837. He attended the country schools, and was graduated from Jackson College, Columbia, Tennessee, in 1854. He studied law, and moved to St. Francis County, Arkansas, in 1856. He married a Ms. Ellenora (also spelled Ellanora) Patton. Later, he remarried to another Arkansas resident, Anna Fussell, with whom he had two daughters, Anna Mae Estes Dunn and Dorothea Dunn who died as an infant in 1888.

Career
Dunn  was elected to the State house of representatives in 1858, and was a successful cotton grower until 1861. He owned slaves. He served as a captain in the Confederate States Army during the Civil War. Continuing his study of the law, he was admitted to the bar in 1867 and commenced the practice of law in Forrest City, Arkansas.

Elected as a Democrat to the Forty-sixth and to the four succeeding Congresses, Dunn served from March 4, 1879, to March 3, 1889. He served as chairman of the Committee on Merchant Marine and Fisheries (Fiftieth Congress). Not a candidate for renomination in 1888, he moved to Los Angeles, California, and continued the practice of law.

Appointed a special commissioner for the prevention of frauds on the customs revenue, Dunn moved to New York City in 1893. He moved to Baton Rouge, Louisiana, in 1895 and engaged in the construction of railroads, until he settled in Texarkana, Texas, in 1905.

Death
Dunn died in Texarkana, Bowie County, Texas, on October 12, 1914 (age 79 years, 343 days). He is interred at Rose Hill Cemetery, Texarkana, Texas.

References

External links

The Strangest Names In American Political History 

1834 births
1914 deaths
People from Wake County, North Carolina
Democratic Party members of the United States House of Representatives from Arkansas
Arkansas lawyers
American planters
American slave owners
19th-century American politicians
Confederate States Army officers
People of Arkansas in the American Civil War